Dodonova is a rural locality (a village) in Yorgvinskoye Rural Settlement, Kudymkarsky District, Perm Krai, Russia. The population was 12 as of 2010.

Geography 
Dodonova is located 17 km north of Kudymkar (the district's administrative centre) by road. Rektanova is the nearest rural locality.

References 

Rural localities in Kudymkarsky District